Pluduno (Gallo: Ploedunoe) is a commune in the Côtes-d'Armor department of Brittany in northwestern France.

The Arguenon river flows through the commune.

Population

People from Pluduno are called pludunonéens in French.

See also
Communes of the Côtes-d'Armor department

References

External links

Communes of Côtes-d'Armor